Zachary William Penprase (born February 16, 1985) is an American-Israeli baseball player who plays shortstop, second base, and left field who is currently a free agent. He plays for the Israel National Baseball Team. He played for Team Israel at the 2019 European Baseball Championship. He also played for the team at the Africa/Europe 2020 Olympic Qualification tournament in Italy in September 2019, which Israel won to qualify to play baseball at the 2020 Summer Olympics. He played for Team Israel at the 2020 Summer Olympics in Tokyo in the summer of 2021.

Early and personal life
Penprase was born in Moorpark, California, and attended Moorpark High School. His mother Elaine is Jewish, and his father Rich is Christian. In 2019 he became an Israeli citizen, thereby becoming a dual Israeli-American.

College
Penprase played college baseball for the Mississippi Valley State University Delta Devils, for whom in both 2005 and 2006 Penprase was Southwestern Athletic Conference All-Conference infielder; in 2010 he finished his degree. In 2006 he led the country in stolen bases, with 60, as he played shortstop. He was named a Jewish Sports Review All Star.  He was then selected by the Philadelphia Phillies in the 13th round of the 2006 Major League Baseball draft.

Professional career

Philadelphia Phillies
In 2006 Penprase played second base and shortstop for the Batavia Muckdogs of the Class A- New York-Pennsylvania League (NYPL), where he was a mid-season All Star, batting .211/.282/.247 with 19 stolen bases. In 2007 he played for the Williamsport Crosscutters of the NYPL, garnering 33 at bats, and for the Lakewood BlueClaws of the Class A South Atlantic League (SAL), with 32 at bats.

Boston Red Sox
He was released by the Phillies on April 4, 2008, signed by the Fargo-Moorhead Redhawks, and then signed by the Boston Red Sox on August 1, 2008, who released him on November 3, 2008. In 2008 Penprase played primarily second base for the Greenville Drive of the Boston Red Sox organization in the SAL, batting .235/.306/.296.

Fargo-Moorhead RedHawks (second stint)
From 2008 until 2015 he played shortstop for the independent league Fargo-Moorhead Redhawks, with Penprase's best seasons including 2008 (.326 batting average), 2009 (leading the Northern League in both runs and stolen bases (45, in 53 attempts), and 2012 (.424 on-base percentage and 47 stolen bases (leading the American Association) in 52 attempts). As of 2019, he held the RedHawks single-season record in runs (100, a Northern League record, in 2009), and career records in runs (584), walks (370), doubles (150), and stolen bases (278). In 2009 he was a Northern League All-Star at shortstop, and in 2012 he was an American Association All-Star at shortstop. In 2012 he played one season for the Sydney Blue Sox of the Australian Baseball League, batting .282/.363/.387 with 16 stolen bases.

New York Boulders
On April 9, 2021, Penprase signed with the New York Boulders of the Frontier League. In 34 games for the Boulders, Penprase slashed .254/.343/.322 with 1 home run and 15 RBIs. He was released by New York on July 9.

Team Israel
Penprase competed on the Israel national baseball team for qualification for the 2020 Olympics. He started all six games at shortstop as the team played in the 2019 European Baseball Championship - B-Pool in early July 2019 in Blagoevgrad, Bulgaria, winning all of its games and advancing to the playoffs against Team Lithuania in the 2019 Playoff Series at the end of July 2019 for the last qualifying spot for the 2019 European Baseball Championship. He batted .381 (8th in the tournament)/.481/.810 (5th) in the B-Pool tournament with 3 doubles (3rd) and 12 RBIs (2nd) in 21 at bats. Penprase said:  "Getting Israeli citizenship was such a special moment and playing for my country, something that is so much bigger than me, was truly amazing."

He played for Team Israel at the 2019 European Baseball Championship. He also played for the team at the Africa/Europe 2020 Olympic Qualification tournament in Italy in September 2019, which Israel won to qualify to play baseball at the 2020 Summer Olympics in Tokyo. In the tournament he played third base in every game and batted .313/.400/.313 with 6 runs (tied for 2nd) in 16 at bats.

He played for Team Israel at the 2020 Summer Olympics in Tokyo in the summer of 2021. He batted three for 12 with a stolen base, and appeared in left field, as a pinch runner, as a pinch hitter, and as a designated hitter.

References

External links

1985 births
Living people
Baseball players from California
Jewish American baseball players
Batavia Muckdogs players
Fargo-Moorhead RedHawks players
Greenville Drive players
Lakewood BlueClaws players
Sydney Blue Sox players
Williamsport Crosscutters players
Baseball shortstops
Israeli baseball players
People from Moorpark, California
Mississippi Valley State Delta Devils baseball players
2019 European Baseball Championship players
Baseball players at the 2020 Summer Olympics
Olympic baseball players of Israel
21st-century American Jews